Speocropia trichroma is a moth of the family Noctuidae first described by Gottlieb August Wilhelm Herrich-Schäffer in 1868. It is found in Florida and on Cuba.

The wingspan is about 30 mm.

References

Moths described in 1868
Hadeninae